Fritz Brandt (1909 – November 30, 1972) was a college football player, one of the "flaming sophomores" on the 1928 Tennessee Volunteers. As an end, he played opposite Paul Hug. He was injured in the 1929 game against Centre. Brandt was selected All-Southern by the United Press.

References

1972 deaths
Tennessee Volunteers football players
People from Unicoi County, Tennessee
American football ends
All-Southern college football players